Lando Norris (born 13 November 1999) is a Belgian-British racing driver currently competing in Formula One with McLaren, racing under the British flag. He won the MSA Formula championship in 2015, and the Toyota Racing Series, Eurocup Formula Renault 2.0 and Formula Renault 2.0 Northern European Cup in 2016. He also received the McLaren Autosport BRDC Award that year. He subsequently joined the McLaren Young Driver Programme in 2017 and won the 2017 FIA Formula 3 European Championship, competing with Carlin Motorsport. Consequently, he was promoted to the Formula 2 Carlin team, where he finished second in 2018. He was then announced as a McLaren driver in 2018, alongside Carlos Sainz Jr. He achieved his first podium in Formula One at the 2020 Austrian Grand Prix and his best finish is second in the 2021 Italian Grand Prix, finishing behind teammate Daniel Ricciardo.

Personal life
Lando Norris was born in Bristol, to Adam and Cisca Norris. His father is a retired pensions manager, and is one of Bristol's wealthiest people as well as the 501st-richest person in the country (as of 2018). His mother Cisca (née Wauman) is from the Flanders region of Belgium. He has three siblings, of which he is the second oldest; younger sisters Flo and Cisca, and an older brother Oliver, who was also involved in karting on a competitive level, until 2014. Norris holds both British and Belgian citizenship, and speaks a small amount of Flemish Dutch. Norris in his early childhood tried horse riding, then quad biking and motorcycle riding before moving into karting after his father took him to watch the national British Karting Championships at age seven. Norris was educated at Millfield School in Street, Somerset. He left school without taking his GCSEs, but studied physics and mathematics with a full-time personal tutor. His family later moved to Glastonbury to allow him to become a day pupil, and to pursue his racing career, citing Valentino Rossi as an inspiration.
He initially resided in Woking near the McLaren team headquarters, but later moved to Monaco in 2022, for financial reasons. 

Between August 2021 and September 2022, Norris was dating Portuguese model Luisa Oliveira. Norris has stated he and his now former girlfriend were subject to abuse and death threats from online trolls.

Racing career

Early career
 Norris started his racing career at the age of seven when he claimed pole position at his first national event. In 2013, Norris competed in KF-Junior karting, winning the CIK FIA European Championship and the International Super Cup, as well as the WSK Euro Series. The following year he won the CIK-FIA KF World Championship with Ricky Flynn Motorsport, making him the youngest karting world champion.

In 2014, Norris made his car racing debut in the Ginetta Junior Championship, a support series to the British Touring Car Championship. He finished third in the championship, winning four races and claiming the Rookie Cup. For 2015, Norris signed with Carlin Motorsport to drive in the newly established MSA Formula Championship (now known as the F4 British Championship). Norris took eight wins, ten pole positions, and fourteen total podiums to win the championship ahead of Ricky Collard and Colton Herta. He also made occasional appearances in the ADAC and Italian Formula 4 championships with Mücke Motorsport where he claimed six podiums from eight starts in the former.

In January 2016, Norris travelled to New Zealand to compete in the Toyota Racing Series with the M2 Competition team. He achieved six race wins, including the New Zealand Grand Prix, and won the championship ahead of Jehan Daruvala. Norris then returned to Europe to race in the Formula Renault 2.0 category with Josef Kaufmann Racing, competing in both the Eurocup and Northern European Cup. He won both series, taking eleven race wins in total and recording ten consecutive pole positions in the latter. At the same time, Norris embarked on a part-time campaign in the BRDC British Formula 3 Championship and claimed four wins in eleven races. In October he made a guest appearance in the final round of the European Formula 3 Championship at the Hockenheimring in preparation for the Macau Grand Prix in November. Norris placed ninth in qualifying in Macau but was eliminated from the qualification race after crashing on the first lap. In the main race, he progressed from 27th on the grid to finish 11th.

Norris raced full-time with Carlin in the 2017 European Formula 3 Championship, and faced competition from Joel Eriksson, Maximilian Günther and Callum Ilott for the championship title. Norris finished on the podium in twenty of the thirty races, including nine wins, and recorded eight pole positions. He clinched the title with two races remaining, marking his fifth racing championship title in four years. In November, Norris made his second appearance at the Macau Grand Prix. He was classified second in qualifying but dropped to seventh in the qualification race. He benefited from an accident between the leaders on the final lap to finish the Grand Prix second behind Dan Ticktum. On the following weekend, Norris made his FIA Formula 2 debut with Campos Racing, replacing Ralph Boschung for the final round at Yas Marina Circuit. 

Norris competed full-time in the 2018 FIA Formula 2 Championship, racing alongside Sérgio Sette Câmara at Carlin. Norris won the opening race at the Bahrain International Circuit from pole position, however, this would prove to be his only race victory of the season. He scored consistent points and podium finishes to hold the lead of the championship until the sixth round at the Red Bull Ring, when George Russell passed him in the standings. Norris retired from both races at the eleventh round at Sochi Autodrom, ruling him out of championship contention and dropping him to third place in the standings behind Alex Albon, although he recovered to second place after the final round at Yas Marina Circuit.

Formula One

In February 2017, Norris was signed as a junior driver with McLaren. Following the announcement, Zak Brown said that Norris was "a fabulous prospect" who deserved the award. Later that year, Norris tested for McLaren in a scheduled mid-season test. He set the second fastest lap in the second day of testing at the Hungaroring. In late 2017, Norris became the official McLaren test and reserve driver for the 2018 season. Norris participated in his first official practice session at the Belgian Grand Prix, recording 26 laps. Norris drove in six further practice sessions during the year.

McLaren (2019–present)

2019

The  was the first of Norris' retirements that season, after damage from a first lap collision with Daniil Kvyat caused him to retire later in the race. Further retirements came at the  after a collision with Lance Stroll and at the  when a brake fire caused his suspension to fail.

Norris was on course to finish seventh at the  but suffered hydraulic problems late in the race and was eventually classified ninth. He was forced to start from the back at the  due to penalties for exceeding the allowed number of engine components for the season. He later retired from the race after a power failure. He maintained this position and was set to record his best career finish but suffered a power failure on his final lap and was classified eleventh.

Three consecutive points finishes followed at the Italian, Singapore and Russian Grands Prix. Norris dropped back after collecting floor damage and eventually finished eleventh. He spent almost two minutes in the pits as his mechanics resolved the problem but he was eventually withdrawn from the race. He ended the season with three consecutive points finishes.

Norris finished his debut Formula One season eleventh in the drivers' championship with 49 points. Teammate Sainz scored 96 points, however Norris out-qualified Sainz at eleven of the twenty-one races. During his debut year, Norris signed a multi-year contract to stay with McLaren for the 2020 season until .

2020: Maiden podium

At the season-opening , Norris qualified in fourth place but was elevated to third after a grid penalty for Lewis Hamilton, the highest grid position of his career at the time and the highest for McLaren since the 2016 Austrian Grand Prix. In the closing stages of the race, third-placed Hamilton was issued a five-second penalty for causing a collision with Alex Albon. Norris set the fastest lap of the race on the final lap to finish 4.802 seconds behind Hamilton, allowing Norris to claim the first podium finish of his career. This made Norris the third youngest podium-finisher in Formula One history. He passed three cars in the final two laps of the race to finish fifth, in what he described as "one of the best races of [his] career".

Six consecutive points finishes came between the British and Tuscan Grands Prix. Following this, Norris faced criticism over his remarks that Stroll "doesn't seem to learn" and his perceived downplaying of Lewis Hamilton's achievement of most Grand Prix wins, describing it as meaning "nothing to him". Subsequently, Norris apologised for his comments about Stroll and also offered a personal apology to Hamilton, stating that his comments were "careless" and that he "[hadn't] shown the respect I should have to certain people".

At the wet Turkish Grand Prix Norris had what he called "[the] worst start of everyone's career ever". He started from fourteenth place after a five-place grid penalty for failing to respect yellow flags in qualifying, but recovered to finish eighth and recorded the fastest lap of the race. Norris ended the season ninth in the drivers' championship with 97 points, eight points behind Sainz.

2021: Maiden pole and fight for 3rd

Norris remained at McLaren for the  season, partnering Daniel Ricciardo as Sainz left the team.

Norris qualified seventh for the season-opening  and finished the race fourth. Norris had run in second place before being passed by Lewis Hamilton with three laps remaining. He finished third to claim his second Formula One podium finish. He recovered places in the race to finish fifth, assisted by crashes and mistakes from drivers ahead.

He finished fifth for the third consecutive race. He bettered this qualifying position at the following weekend's , starting in second place after setting a time 0.048 seconds behind pole-sitter Max Verstappen. Norris received a penalty during the race after being judged to have forced Sergio Pérez off the track. He finished the race third to claim his third podium of the season. This result moved him up to third place in the drivers' championship.

He improved to third place by the first corner but was hit from behind by Bottas, causing him to collide with Verstappen. Norris retired from the race two laps later due to heavy damage. Norris finished the race second behind teammate Ricciardo, scoring his fourth podium of the season and securing McLaren's first one-two finish since the 2010 Canadian Grand Prix. He lost the lead to Carlos Sainz on the first lap before regaining it on lap 13. Norris continued to lead the race with Lewis Hamilton close behind until rain began to fall in the closing laps. Norris decided to stay out on dry-weather tyres while Hamilton pitted for intermediate tyres. The rain soon worsened, allowing Hamilton to overtake and forcing Norris to pit for intermediates. Norris finished seventh, recording the fastest lap of the race. Following that race Norris was unable to finish any of the remaining seven races of the season in a higher position than seventh, although he was able to score points in each one of them. He finished his season in sixth place in the standings, having lost out to former teammate Sainz by just 4.5 points.

2022 : Imola podium and 7th in the standings

In February 2022 Norris signed a contract extension with McLaren that will see him be with team until at least 2025. Norris completed all three days of the Bahrain Official Preseason Testing after Ricciardo tested positive for COVID-19 and was unable to attend. At the new Miami Grand Prix, Norris brought out the safety car when his McLaren MCL36 collided with Pierre Gasly's AlphaTauri.

In May 2022, despite suffering with tonsillitis, Norris came sixth in the Monaco Grand Prix and secured the fastest lap.

2023
Norris has remained with McLaren for 2023 where he is partnered at the team by 2021 Formula 2 champion Oscar Piastri, who replaced Daniel Ricciardo. At the first race at Bahrain, Norris experienced reliability issues. These issues dropped him down to last of the finishing drivers at 17th. At the next round in Saudi Arabia, Norris could only qualify 19th after making an error by hitting the  wall.  This marked only the second Q1 elimination of Norris, the only time this had happened before was at the 2019 German Grand Prix.

Endurance racing
It was announced that Norris would join United Autosports in order to race in the 2018 24 Hours of Daytona in the 2018 IMSA SportsCar Championship alongside two-time Formula One champion Fernando Alonso as well as the 2016–17 Asian Le Mans Series LMP3 champion Philip Hanson.  Norris and his team finished the race in 13th place in their class and 38th position overall. Following the race, Fernando Alonso hailed Norris's 'impressive speed' stating that "The stints he did were very impressive - the teamwork, the preparation, the focus" 

Norris has also competed in the 2020 24 Hours of Le Mans Virtual with Team Redline in the LMP2 class alongside fellow F1 competitor Max Verstappen and sim-racers Atze Kerkhof and Greger Huttu. Qualifying in 5th place for the race start, the team were met with a series of technical problems on Verstappen's end and were forced to retire overnight as a result of Verstappen crashing. However, due to a red flag being called, their team were allowed to rejoin back into the grid, 18 laps behind and last on the LMP2 grid. In the end, Norris and the team finished 25th in the LMP2 standings and in the overall standings.

Other ventures 
Norris raised $12,000 for the COVID-19 Solidarity Response Fund in support of the World Health Organization during an online streaming event on Twitch. He also founded Team Quadrant, an esports team which also focuses on content creation and apparel, in 2020.

Subsequent to his Formula One debut in 2019, Norris confirmed that he had struggled with his mental health from the pressures of the sport, turning to the Mind charity for support. Alongside his support of the Mind charity, Norris himself is an advocate for increasing mental health visibility in sports.

In September 2021, Norris launched a kart racing brand known as the LN Racing Kart. The manufacturing is supported by the OTK Kart Group, while operations are carried out by Ricky Flynn Motorsport.

Awards
Autosport Awards British Competition Driver of the Year: 2021

Karting record

Karting career summary

Racing record

Racing career summary 

 As Norris was a guest driver, he was ineligible for points.
 Season still in progress.

Complete Ginetta Junior Championship results
(key) (Races in bold indicate pole position) (Races in italics indicate fastest lap)

Complete MSA Formula results 
(key) (Races in bold indicate pole position; races in italics indicate fastest lap)

Complete Toyota Racing Series results 
(key) (Races in bold indicate pole position) (Races in italics indicate fastest lap)

Complete FIA Formula 3 European Championship results
(key) (Races in bold indicate pole position) (Races in italics indicate fastest lap)

 Driver did not finish the race but was classified as he completed over 90% of the race distance.
 As Norris was a guest driver, he was ineligible for points.

Complete Macau Grand Prix results

Complete FIA Formula 2 Championship results
(key) (Races in bold indicate pole position) (Races in italics indicate points for the fastest lap of top ten finishers)

24 Hours of Daytona results

Complete Formula One results
(key) (Races in bold indicate pole position; races in italics indicate fastest lap)

 Did not finish, but was classified as he had completed more than 90% of the race distance.
 Season still in progress.

References

External links

 
 
 British Racing Drivers' Club profile

1999 births
Living people
English racing drivers
Sportspeople from Bristol
English expatriate sportspeople in Monaco
Toyota Racing Series drivers
British F4 Championship drivers
British people of Belgian descent
ADAC Formula 4 drivers
Italian F4 Championship drivers
Formula Renault Eurocup drivers
Formula Renault 2.0 NEC drivers
BRDC British Formula 3 Championship drivers
FIA Formula 3 European Championship drivers
FIA Formula 2 Championship drivers
24 Hours of Daytona drivers
English Formula One drivers
McLaren Formula One drivers
Twitch (service) streamers
People educated at Millfield
English victims of crime
Ginetta Junior Championship drivers
Carlin racing drivers
Mücke Motorsport drivers
Josef Kaufmann Racing drivers
M2 Competition drivers
Campos Racing drivers
WeatherTech SportsCar Championship drivers
Karting World Championship drivers
United Autosports drivers